Olaf Schreiber (born 12 September 1969) is a retired German football midfielder who played for FC Carl Zeiss Jena, FSV Zwickau and VfL Bochum.

Career
He was a part of the East German squad at the 1989 FIFA World Youth Championship, playing all three matches.

Statistics

References

External links
 
 

1969 births
Living people
People from Zwickau
German footballers
East German footballers
FC Carl Zeiss Jena players
FSV Zwickau players
VfL Bochum players
Bundesliga players
2. Bundesliga players
Association football midfielders
Footballers from Saxony